Àngel Lluís Mañana Fernández (born 15 February 1985) is a Spanish-born Equatoguinean basketball player who plays as a shooting guard for Primera División de Baloncesto club CB Marcelina Benifaió and the Equatorial Guinea national team.

Early life
Mañana was born in Valencia to an Equatorial Guinean father and a Spanish mother.

Club career
Mañana is a Valencia Basket product, who later played in the United States, France, England and he has also been part of the Mongomo Basket squad in Equatorial Guinea.

International career
Mañana has joined the Equatorial Guinea national basketball team in March 2018.

References

External links

1985 births
Living people
Citizens of Equatorial Guinea through descent
Equatoguinean men's basketball players
Shooting guards
Equatoguinean sportspeople of Spanish descent
Equatoguinean expatriate sportspeople in the United States
Expatriate basketball people in the United States
Equatoguinean expatriate sportspeople in France
Expatriate basketball people in France
Equatoguinean expatriate sportspeople in England
Expatriate basketball people in England
Spanish men's basketball players
Sportspeople from Valencia
Spanish sportspeople of Equatoguinean descent
Spanish expatriate basketball people in the United States
Spanish expatriate basketball people in France
Spanish expatriate basketball people
Spanish expatriate sportspeople in England